The 2011–12 Primera División season was the 30th professional season of Venezuela's top-flight football league.

Teams
Eighteen teams will participate this season, sixteen of whom remain from the previous season. Caroní and Atlético Venezuela were relegated after accumulating the fewest points in the 2010–11 season aggregate table. They will be replaced by Llaneros and Tucanes, the 2010–11 Segunda División winner and runner-up, respectively.

Torneo Apertura
The Torneo Apertura is the first tournament of the season. It began on August 2011 and ended on December 2011.

Standings

Results

Torneo Clausura
The Torneo Clausura is the second tournament of the season.

Standings

Results

Aggregate table

Season top goalscorers

Source:

Serie Final
Because Deportivo Lara won both the Apertura and Clausura, the Serie Final was not played, and Deportivo Lara was declared champion automatically.

Serie Sudamericana
Other than the teams which already qualify for the Copa Libertadores (Apertura and Clausura champions and the best-placed team in the aggregate table) and the Copa Sudamericana (Copa Venezuela champion), the eight best-placed teams in the aggregate table will contest in the Serie Sudamericana for the remaining two berths to the Copa Sudamericana, which qualify the two winners to the First Stage.

In the first round, the matchups are:
Match A (1 vs. 8)
Match B (2 vs. 7)
Match C (3 vs. 6)
Match D (4 vs. 5)
In the second round, the matchups are:
Winner A vs. Winner C
Winner B vs. Winner D
For the two second round winners, the team with the better record in the aggregate table will receive the Venezuela 3 berth, while the other team will receive the Venezuela 4 berth.

First round

Match A

Match B

Match C

Match D

Second round

Winner A vs. Winner C

Winner B vs. Winner D

References

External links 
Official website of the Venezuelan Football Federation 
Season regulations 

2011-12
2011 in South American football leagues
2012 in South American football leagues
2011–12 in Venezuelan football